The Clarbeston Road and Letterston Railway was a small railway company formed to give the Great Western Railway a more direct route to the port at Fishguard Harbour.

History

The original proposal of 1844 (authorised by Act of Parliament in 1845) had been for the western terminus to be at Fishguard, with Haverfordwest on a branch, and by August 1847 work was in progress within  of Fishguard. In 1848, the effects of the Great Irish Famine made Ireland a less attractive proposition, and work on the western end of the line stopped as a result.

The NP&FR was acquired by the Fishguard and Rosslare Railways and Harbours Co. (F&RR&H) in 1894.

A new double-track line was proposed by the GWR to shorten the distance to Fishguard; this was the Clarbeston Road and Letterston Railway, which opened on 30 August 1906 between Clarbeston Junction ( from Paddington) and Letterston Junction.

The intermediate stations were closed on 6 April 1964, but the line remains open for services to Fishguard & Goodwick and Fishguard Harbour stations. Falling traffic on the line caused it to be reduced to single-track on 16 May 1971 with a passing loop at Letterston Junction.

Notes

References

Railway lines opened in 1906
Railway lines in Wales
Great Western Railway constituents
1906 establishments in Wales